Brigitte Ahrens (born 13 September 1945 in Chemnitz, Germany) is a German schlager-singer, who was well known in East Germany.

Biography

Ahrens sang in the choir of the Klub der Jungen Talente in Karl-Marx-Stadt between 1961 and 1964. In 1967, she participated in Heinz Quermann's talent contest Herzklopfen kostenlos. She was successful in a microphone casting for the radio channel Rundfunk der DDR in East Berlin. At the Zentralen Studio für Unterhaltungskunst, she learned singing, ballet, acting and elocution. 
 
Ahrens became well known through her appearances in the television channel DFF. She released several records on the Amiga label, and these have become collectors' items in Germany and the Benelux countries. She appeared in concerts in Poland, Romania, Bulgaria, Hungary, Czechoslovakia, and the Benelux countries. She was musical editor at the regional radio channel Karl-Marx-Stadt and at its successor Sachsen Radio. After a long break, she released the CD Ich gehe auf die Fünfzig...na und? in 2005.

Ahrens gained third place in the East German Schlager Song Contest in 1971 with Wo ist die liebe Sonne composed by Arndt Bause. Her biggest success was Da ging für mich die Sonne auf, composed by Ralf Petersen in 1974.

Discography

1968 Donaumelodie
1969 Heut ist mein Tag
1969 Warum hat er wieder nicht geschrieben
1969 Ade, ade, der Zug fährt ab
1969 Lass dich doch bald wieder sehen
1969 Was soll ich mit roten Rosen
1970 Halt dein Herz fest
1970 Du mit deinen Wanderaugen
1971 Alles dreht sich um uns beide
1971 Wenn dein Herz mir verzeiht
1971 Heut ist mein Tag
1971 Wo ist die liebe Sonne
1972 Und der Sommer kommt bald zurück
1972 Komm in den Tag
1974 Da ging für mich die Sonne auf
1974 Insel im Fluss
2005   CD Ich geh auf die Fünfzig … na und

Songs in radio

 1970 Mal mir einen Regenbogen
 1971 Es geht weiter
 1974 Schau nur auf die Sonnenuhr

External links
 Official site

References

1945 births
Living people
People from Chemnitz
German women singers
Schlager musicians